Go! is the third studio album by the alternative rock band Letters to Cleo. It was released in 1997 on Revolution Records. It was their first album without their original drummer, Stacy Jones, who was replaced by Tom Polce.

The album peaked at No. 45 on Billboard'''s Top Heatseekers chart.

Production
The album was produced by Peter Collins. It was recorded at Long View Farm, in North Brookfield, Massachusetts. Greg Hawkes played keyboards on "Anchor".

Critical receptionTrouser Press called the album "effective and likable," writing that "Hanley explores the titular theme of dispatching an ex, singing her disillusioned and bitter lyrics ... with conviction and power against loud rock-pop that reaches its apogee in the nearly Breeders-like surge of 'Anchor'." The Orange County Register'' considered it "nothing special, each song an imitation of standard alternative music this decade without adding anything new to the mix."

Track listing
All songs by Kay Hanley and Letters to Cleo.

"I Got Time" – 2:44
"Because of You" – 3:02
"Anchor" – 3:24
"Find You Dead" – 2:52
"Veda Very Shining" – 3:30
"Co-Pilot" – 3:40
"Go!" – 2:15
"Sparklegirl" – 3:18
"Alouette & Me" – 3:38
"I'm a Fool" – 3:16
"Disappear" – 3:32

Personnel
Greg Hawkes - synthesizer, keyboards
Barry Green - trombone
Jim Horn - baritone saxophone
Sam Levine - tenor saxophone
Steve Patrick - trumpet
Michael Eisenstein - guitar, keyboards, vocals
Kay Hanley - vocals, guitar 
Greg McKenna - guitar, vocals
Scott Riebling - bass, vocals
Tom Polce - drums, percussion, vocals
Ellen "Mumma" Hanley - vocals
Jed Parish - keyboards

Production
Producer: Peter Collins
Engineer: Paul David Hager
Assistant engineer: Jesse Henderson, Craig Nepp, Tom Richards, Ted Paduck
Mixing: Tom Lord-Alge
Mastering: Bob Ludwig
Recording: Paul David Hager
Loop programming: Anthony J. Resta

References

1997 albums
Letters to Cleo albums